Diacko Fofana (born 29 July 1994) is a French footballer of Malian descent who currently plays for the B-team of Le Havre AC. He primarily plays as a right back.

Career 
Born in Verdon, Fofana previously played in the youth academies of professional clubs Le Havre and Caen before signing with Nice in July 2011. On 28 January 2012, he made his professional debut in a 1–0 defeat to Montpellier. Fofana started the match, but was substituted out after 60 minutes.

Honours

Club 
Nice
 Coupe Gambardella (1): 2011–12

References

External links 
 
 
 
 
 
 

Living people
1994 births
Association football fullbacks
French footballers
French people of Malian descent
OGC Nice players
Athlético Marseille players
Le Havre AC players
Ligue 1 players
Championnat National players
Championnat National 3 players
France youth international footballers